Aluemeri (Finnish), Territorialhavet (Swedish) is a southeastern neighborhood of Helsinki, Finland.

Neighbourhoods of Helsinki